Love Story with Cramps is a 1995 Italian romantic comedy film written and directed  by Pino Quartullo.

Plot

Cast

 Pino Quartullo as Francesco
 Chiara Caselli as  Marcella/Amanda 
 Sergio Rubini as  Roberto
 Debora Caprioglio as Alessia
 Rossella Falk as Agency Director 
 Antonio Allocca as  Pension Owner

See also   
 List of Italian films of 1995

References

External links

Italian romantic comedy films
1995 romantic comedy films
Films directed by Pino Quartullo
1995 films
1990s Italian films